Anders Griffen is a drummer, composer, and trumpet player from Brooklyn, New York. Griffen works in a range of contexts including folk, jazz, pop, improvised music, and modern dance theater.

Career
Griffen is known for his work with songwriters and jazz musicians, playing the drum set sensitively and quietly enough to accompany acoustic music. His first appearance on record was in 1997, a tribute to Charles Moffett entitled Vision Blue  with tenor saxophonist, Frank Lowe. They also completed two European tours with bassist, Bernard Santacruz.  Other notable artists that have sought Griffen's accompaniment include Regina Spektor, Paleface, Jeffrey Lewis and Kimya Dawson, and their "super-group", The Bundles, and bands like Dufus and Death to Anders.

In recent years Griffen has formed a partnership with singer-songwriter Diane Cluck. They perform as a duo and have toured the Pacific Northwest and the United Kingdom. He also performs monthly with various other musicians and choreographers in and around New York.

Reviews
 "Anders Griffen is a very different drummer than Moffett, far quieter and unobtrusive." Derek Taylor, 2001 
 "drummer Anders Griffen ... brings backing rhythm to the solo pieces with ghostly finesse ... Griffen's technique is so understated and tailored to [the] music that sometimes it feels like he isn't playing at all." Sam Wolby, 2010

References

External links 
 Anders Griffen | Biography
 Antifolk | The Antifolk music scene website | Artists Bands & News
 Anders Griffen music, videos, stats, and photos
 Anders Griffen

Year of birth missing (living people)
Living people
Musicians from Brooklyn
American drummers
American male composers
21st-century American composers
American trumpeters
American male trumpeters
Rough Trade Records artists
21st-century trumpeters
21st-century American male musicians
The Bundles members